Genron NPO (言論ＮＰＯ) is a Japanese think tank that was established in 2001. Its president and founder is Yasushi Kudo. Data from the think tank has been referenced by outlets such as Yonhap, Bloomberg, CNN, Financial Times, and The Christian Science Monitor.

References 

The Genron NPO, a Japanese Think Tank Committed to Bringing Peace to Northeast Asia Is Conducting a Survey with Leading Global Journalists

External links 
Official site

2001 establishments in Japan
Organizations established in 2001
Think tanks based in Japan
Foreign policy and strategy think tanks